Jumanji 2 may refer to:

 Zathura (2002 book) sequel to the 1981 book Jumanji, second book in the book series
 Zathura: A Space Adventure (2005 film) second film in the Jumanji film franchise, sequel to Jumanji
 Jumanji: Welcome to the Jungle (2017 film) third film in the Jumanji film franchise, second one called "Jumanji"
 Jumanji: The Next Level (2019 film) fourth film in the Jumanji film franchise, sequel to Jumanji: Welcome to the Jungle

See also
 Jumanji (disambiguation)
 Zathura (disambiguation)